The First Battle of Monte Grappa, also known as First Battle of the Piave in Italy, was a battle fought during World War I between the armies of the Austro-Hungarian Empire and the Kingdom of Italy for control of the Monte Grappa massif, which covered the left flank of the new Italian Piave front.

The Italian Army was in all-out retreat after the Austro-Hungarian autumn offensive of 1917. The Italian Chief of the general staff general, Luigi Cadorna, had ordered the construction of fortified defenses around the Monte Grappa summit in order to make the mountain range an impregnable fortress. When the Austro-Hungarian offensive routed the Italians, the new Italian chief of staff, Armando Diaz, ordered the Fourth Army to stop their retreat and defend these positions between the Roncone and the Tomatico mountains, with the support of the Second Army.

The Austro-Hungarians, despite help from the German Army's Alpenkorps and numerical superiority, failed to take the mountain's summit during the first battle of Monte Grappa, which lasted from November 11, 1917 to December 23, 1917. Armando Diaz allowed his local commanders much more freedom of manoeuvre than his predecessor, which resulted in a more elastic and effective Italian defense.

Thus the Italian front along the Piave river was stabilized and the Austro-Hungarians failed to enter the plains beyond and to take the city of Venice.

References 

 Monte Grappa
International Encyclopedia of the First World War, ed. by Ute Daniel, Peter Gatrell, Oliver Janz, Heather Jones, Jennifer Keene, Alan Kramer, and Bill Nasson, issued by Freie Universität Berlin, Berlin 2018-06-22. DOI: 10.15463/ie1418.11278. https://encyclopedia.1914-1918-online.net/article/monte_grappa_battle_of

See also
Monte Grappa
Second Battle of Monte Grappa
Third Battle of Monte Grappa

Conflicts in 1917
1917 in Italy
1917 in Austria-Hungary
Military history of Italy during World War I
Battles of World War I involving Italy
Battles of World War I involving Austria-Hungary
Battles of World War I involving Germany
Battles of the Italian Front
November 1917 events